Are Kristoffer Grongstad (born April 9, 1988 in Namsos, Norway) is a handball player. He chose to retire in 2011, age 23, when he decided to focus on his studies.

Handball career 
Grongstad started in the local handball club Klompen HK, before he decided to move to Trondheim to pursue a handball career at the age of 16. He started playing for Strindheim Idrettslag before he quite quickly changed club to Heimdal HK that played in the top league. Because of the financial mess in Heimdal HK they went bankrupt after two seasons in the club. Then Grongstad transferred to Elverum where he played for Elverum Handball. After two seasons in Elverum, he again transferred, then to Nøtterøy Idrettsforening. When Grongstad had completed his second season for Nøtterøy Idrettsforening he chose to retire.

Medals in handball 
 1.division - Gold (2011)
 Norwegian Cup - Silver (2008)
 Playoff - Gold (2007)
 1.division - Gold (2006)

Media focus 
At the age of 20, Grongstad came out as the first open gay top athlete in Norway. This caused a stir in Norwegian and Scandinavian press. The first six days after Grongstad told his story in the media, it was calculated that the media attention he got was worth over 2.8 million NOK. Two years after Grongstad first told about his sexual orientation in the media, he said he regretted the way he did it and we warned other young athletes to do the same, but at the same time he urged the established athletes to take the first steps. Grongstad was a part of a book project called "Skapsprengerne" that was written by the Norwegian minister Anniken Huitfeldt. He did this project with other celebrities like Gro Hammerseng, Marit Breivik and the Crown Princess of Norway, Mette Marit. On several occasions Grongstad goes travels across the country to hold talks about his personal experience through his career and also the importance to take the time to recognize other people when you are a coach for UNICEF in a project called "Den Ene". Grongstad has also since 2010 been in a resource group for the Norwegian Handball Federation where they focus on how to include everyone in the sports.

Awards 
 Sports hero of the year (2010)
 Honorary Rose (2009)
 Norwegian Hero (2009)

References

1988 births
People from Namsos
Norwegian male handball players
Living people
Sportspeople from Trøndelag